Mourning in America and Dreaming in Color is the fifth studio album by American rapper Brother Ali. It was released via Rhymesayers Entertainment on September 18, 2012. Entirely produced by Jake One, it includes a guest appearance from Dr. Cornel West. It reached number 44 on the Billboard 200 chart. It sold 10,000 copies in its first week of release.

Critical reception
At Metacritic, which assigns a weighted average score out of 100 to reviews from mainstream critics, Mourning in America and Dreaming in Color received an average score of 80% based on 11 reviews.

David Jeffries of AllMusic gave the album 4 stars out of 5, saying, "Layered viewpoints, bittersweet situations, and complicated anger flow out of this articulate effort, but the sweet trick of the album is how approachable it is, living up to its title with equal shares of Mourning and Dreaming." Nate Patrin of Pitchfork gave the album a 7.9 out of 10, saying, 'Mourning in America and Dreaming in Color is where the political agitation of The Undisputed Truth and the social humanism of Us intersect, and there's no vague platitudes or defeatist cynicism here."

Jaeki Cho of XXL said,  "[Jake One's] distinguished soul production provides the necessary thump throughout, proving that one-producer-one-MC formula works superbly for this juncture."Exclaim! named it as one of the most unappreciated albums of 2012. Potholes in My Blog'' placed it at number 41 on the "50 Best Albums of 2012" list.

Track listingNotes'''
 The bonus tracks are only available digitally through iTunes, Amazon Music and Google Play Music.

Charts

References

External links
 

2012 albums
Brother Ali albums
Rhymesayers Entertainment albums
Albums produced by Jake One